Pseudophimosia sexlineata is a species of beetle in the family Cerambycidae.

It was first described by Buquet in 1859.

References

Trachyderini
Beetles described in 1859